The Museum of the History of Lithuanian Medicine and Pharmacy is located in a restored 16th-century building at the Town Hall Square in the Old Town of Kaunas, Lithuania. 

It moved to its current location in 1987, although its history dates to 1936. Alfonsas Kaikaris (1922–1997), a professor of pharmacy, is credited as the founder of the museum; his personal collection formed the basis of its holdings.  The Lithuanian Pharmacists' Union worked to collect materials as well. It is sponsored by Kaunas University of Medicine.

The museum's permanent collection consists of the belongings of Lithuanian doctors, pharmacists and hospitals, along with medical and pharmaceutical implements and documents. Temporary exhibitions commemorate prominent doctors' and pharmacists' anniversaries. The exhibits include dental equipment along with displays of archaic medications such as Erektosan (a herbal version of Viagra), love potions, Venus Hair Potion, and Caput Mortuum (a medieval male vitality booster and epilepsy treatment composed of dead heads).

There one can enjoy the scenes of pre-history of medicine and pharmacy – watching exhibition stands arranged with great inventiveness and authenticity: presenting a shaman curing a baby as well as a Lithuanian sorceress.

See also 
 History of pharmacy
 History of medicine

References 

Museums in Kaunas
Pharmacy museums
Medical and health organizations based in Lithuania